The orange-billed lorikeet (Neopsittacus pullicauda) is a species of parrot in the family Psittaculidae.
It is found in New Guinea.
Its natural habitat is subtropical or tropical moist montane forests. 

It is mainly green in color, with red underparts and yellowish streaking on the head. It can be differentiated from the similar-looking yellow-billed lorikeet by its smaller size and orange bill. It feeds on nectar, flowers, fruit, and pollen. It is listed as a least-concern species by the IUCN due to its large range and lack of severe declines in its population.

Taxonomy and systematics 
The orange-billed lorikeet is one of two species in the genus Neopsittacus. It is basal within the genus, and it and the congeneric yellow-billed lorikeet are basal within a clade formed by Neopsittacus, Lorius, Psitteuteles, Parvipsitta, Pseudeos, Chalcopsitta, Glossoptilus, Glossopsitta, Saudareos, Eos, and Trichoglossus.

It was originally described as a species by Ernst Hartert in 1896. The generic name Neopsittacus is from the Greek νεος (neos), meaning new, and ψιττακος (psittakos), meaning parrot. The specific epithet pullicauda is from the Latin pullus, meaning dark-colored, and cauda, meaning tail. Alternative names for the species include emerald lorikeet, alpine lorikeet and orange-billed mountain lorikeet.

The species shows clinal variation, with birds from western populations smaller and paler than ones from the southeast. It is treated monotypic by the IOU; however, some authorities recognize as many as three subspecies, with populations from central western New Guinea separated as N. p. alpinus and populations from northeastern New Guinea separated as N. p. socialis.

Description 
Adults are mainly green, with a red underparts from the throat to the center of the abdomen. The crown, nape, and cheeks are streaked with yellow or green, and the nape is washed with olive green. The underwing coverts and underwing band are red in color. The uppertail is green above and olive green below, with red lateral feather bases. It can be told apart from the similar looking yellow-billed lorikeet by its smaller size, richer color, and smaller, orange bill. Immatures are duller in color, with less red on their underparts and an orangish-brown bill. Fledglings have yellow beaks, which turn orange at around 6 months of age.

Distribution and habitat 
The orange-billed lorikeet is endemic to the island of New Guinea. It inhabits forest canopy and forest edges at high elevations in mountains in the Central Range and the Huon Peninsula, but is absent from the Bird's Head Peninsula. At lower elevations, it often inhabits the same areas as the yellow-billed lorikeet. It is found in both primary and secondary forest, mainly in tall secondary growth and at forest edges.

Behaviour and ecology 
It is typically found in pairs, small groups, or flocks of up to 30 individuals.

Diet 
It feeds on pollen, nectar, flowers, fruits and uncommonly, seeds. It is more nectarivorous than the yellow-billed lorikeet. Foraging mainly occurs in the canopy, but also at lower levels.

Reproduction 
Its breeding season is in October. It lays clutches of 2 eggs. It nests in hollows.

Status 
The species is listed as least-concern on the IUCN Red List due to its large range and lack of severe declines in its population.

References

orange-billed lorikeet
orange-billed lorikeet
Taxonomy articles created by Polbot